SS Iron Knob was a  Australian cargo ship of BHP Shipping. It was built by Poole & Steele Ltd of Adelaide, South Australia, in 1922 for the Australian Commonwealth Line and initially named SS Euwarra. It was sold to BHP Shipping in October 1923 and renamed Iron Knob, becoming one of three "E" class steamships in BHP service.

In its 32 years of service, it made 393 voyages between Newcastle and other Australian ports.

In 1955 it was sold to Panatiotis Vrangos of Italy, reregistered in Panama, and renamed SS Clarisse. The Clarisse sank in heavy seas in the Indian Ocean near  on 15 July 1957.

References

1921 ships
Iron and steel steamships of Australia
Ships of BHP Shipping
Maritime incidents in 1957